On the Red Cliff is a 1922 German silent drama film directed by Hanna Henning and starring Fritz Kortner, Agnes Straub, and Hans Adalbert Schlettow. It premiered at the Marmorhaus in Berlin.

The film's sets were designed by the art director Julian Ballenstedt.

Cast
In alphabetical order

References

Bibliography

External links

1922 films
Films of the Weimar Republic
Films directed by Hanna Henning
German silent feature films
German black-and-white films
1922 drama films
German drama films
Films based on German novels
Silent drama films
1920s German films